Manuel Estuardo López Rodas (born 26 April 1990) is a Guatemalan professional footballer who plays as a defender for Liga Nacional club Cobán Imperial and the Guatemala national team.

Career
López began his career with local Guatemalan side Sayaxche, before stints with Heredia, Malacateco, Deportivo Quiriguá, and Guastatoya, before signing with Municipal on 27 June 2018.

International career
López debuted with the Guatemala national team in a 1–0 friendly win over Costa Rica on 23 March 2019. He was called up to represent Guatemala at the 2021 CONCACAF Gold Cup.

Honours
Guastatoya
Liga Nacional de Guatemala: Clausura 2018

Municipal 
Liga Nacional de Guatemala: Apertura 2019

Cobán Imperial 
Liga Nacional de Guatemala: Apertura 2022

References

External links
 
 

1990 births
Living people
Sportspeople from Guatemala City
Guatemalan footballers
Guatemala international footballers
Association football defenders
Comunicaciones F.C. players
C.S.D. Municipal players
Liga Nacional de Fútbol de Guatemala players
2021 CONCACAF Gold Cup players